The Archdiocese of Denver is a Latin Church ecclesiastical jurisdiction or diocese of the Catholic Church that encompasses northern Colorado. It is part of the XIII Conference Region and includes 113 parishes, 307 priests, and an estimated 550,000 lay Catholics. The seat of the archdiocese is the Cathedral Basilica of the Immaculate Conception at 401 East Colfax Avenue. The current Archbishop of Denver is Samuel Aquila. The Archdiocese of Denver is the metropolitan archdiocese of its ecclesiastical province, which also includes three suffragan diocese: the Dioceses of Cheyenne, Colorado Springs, and Pueblo.

Area
Between the archdiocese's creation and the erection of the Diocese of Pueblo in 1941, the Archdiocese of Denver was the sole Latin Church jurisdiction in the state of Colorado.

History
The area that now comprises the Archdiocese of Denver was part of the Diocese of Santa Fe. In 1868, Pope Pius IX split territory from the Diocese of Santa Fe in New Mexico and the Diocese of Grass Valley in California to form the Vicariate Apostolic of Colorado and Utah. In 1870, he changed the name to the Vicariate Apostolic of Colorado, and transferred the territory of Utah to the Archdiocese of San Francisco. August 16, 1887, Pope Leo XIII created the Diocese of Denver, which covered the entire state of Colorado.

On November 15, 1941, Pope Pius XII separated territory from the Diocese of Denver to form the Diocese of Pueblo and elevated the Denver Diocese to an archdiocese. On November 10, 1983, Pope John Paul II separated territory from both the Archdiocese of Denver and the Diocese of Pueblo to form the Diocese of Colorado Springs.

On May 29, 2012, Pope Benedict XVI named Bishop Samuel Joseph Aquila of the Diocese of Fargo, North Dakota as fifth archbishop of Denver. Bishop James Conley served as Apostolic Administrator of the Archdiocese from the departure of Archbishop Charles J. Chaput in September 2011 until the new Archbishop was installed July 18, 2012, at the Cathedral of the Immaculate Conception.

Reports of sex abuse
In 1996, the priest John Stein, who was arrested for sex abuse charges in 1956, settled a sex abuse lawsuit on terms which were confidential. The man suing Stein accused Stein of molesting him hundreds of times over a three-year period starting in 1953. Stein, who died in 2001, also had two other accusers as well.

On October 23, 2019, Colorado Attorney General Phil Weiser released the results of an eight-month investigation revealing that 43 Catholic clergy were credibly accused of sexually abusing at least 166 children throughout the state of Colorado since 1950. At least 127 of these children were molested by 22 clergy serving in the Archdiocese of Denver. The report also criticized archdiocese's handling of cases involving the priest Harold Robert White, who was referred to as "the most prolific known clergy child sex abuser in Colorado history." White, who was first accused of sex abuse in 1960, was transferred to different parishes throughout Colorado and was accused of sexually abusing 63 children. He was not permanently removed from ministry until 1993 and died in 2006. On October 16, 2020, it was revealed that all three of Colorado's Catholic Dioceses, including the Archdiocese of Denver, had paid $6.6 million in compensation to 81 victims of clergy sex abuse within the past year, regardless of how long ago the abuse happened.

On December 1, 2020, Weiser's final report revealed that there were an additional 9 credibly accused clergy and 46 alleged victims in both in the Archdiocese of Denver and its suffragan Diocese of Pueblo. A total 52 priests who served in the Archdiocese of Denver and its two Colorado suffragan Dioceses of Pueblo and Colorado Springs were named in the final report as having committed acts of sex abuse. Prominent Archdiocese of Denver priest Charles B. Woodrich, also known as "Father Woody," was among those listed. Father Woody was known for his work in local homeless shelters. Woodrich was among five priests added to the final report who were accused of committing acts of sex abuse while serving in the Archdiocese of Denver.

Bishops

Bishops of Denver
 Joseph Projectus Machebeuf (1868–1889)
 Nicholas Chrysostom Matz (1889–1917)
 John Henry Tihen (1917–1931)
 Urban John Vehr (1931–1941), Elevated to Archbishop

Archbishops of Denver
 Urban John Vehr (1941–1967)
 James Vincent Casey (1967–1986)
 James Francis Stafford (1986–1996), appointed President of the Pontifical Council for the Laity and later Major Penitentiary of the Apostolic Penitentiary (elevated to Cardinal in 1998)
 Charles J. Chaput, OFM Cap (1997–2011), appointed Archbishop of Philadelphia
 Samuel Joseph Aquila (2012–present)

Auxiliary bishops of Denver
 David M. Maloney (1961–1967), appointed Bishop of Wichita
 George Evans (1969–1985)
 Richard Hanifen (1974–1984), appointed Bishop of Colorado Springs
 Jose Horacio Gómez Velasco (2001–2005), appointed Archbishop of San Antonio and later Coadjutor Archbishop of Los Angeles and subsequently succeeded to the latter see
 James D. Conley (2008–2012), appointed Bishop of Lincoln
 Jorge Rodríguez-Novelo (2016–present)

Other priests of this diocese who became bishops
 Hubert Michael Newell, appointed Coadjutor Bishop (in 1947) and later Bishop of Cheyenne
 Ralph Walker Nickless, appointed Bishop of Sioux City in 2005
 John Baptist Pitaval, appointed Auxiliary Bishop of Santa Fe in 1902 and later Archbishop of Santa Fe

High schools
 Bishop Machebeuf Catholic High School, Denver
 Holy Family High School, Broomfield

Seminaries
 Saint John Vianney Theological Seminary, Denver

Cemeteries

 Saint Simeon Catholic Cemetery is a Catholic cemetery operated by the Archdiocese of Denver.  The cemetery is located at 22001 E. State Highway 30, Aurora, CO 80018, adjacent to Buckley Space Force Base.
 Mount Olivet Cemetery, Wheat Ridge, consecrated 1892
 Saint Simeon Catholic Cemetery, Aurora, dedicated 2004

References

External links

 Roman Catholic Archdiocese of Denver Official Site

 
 
Catholic Church in Colorado
Denver
Denver
Denver
1868 establishments in Colorado Territory
Christianity in Denver